Sangam is a live album by jazz saxophonist Charles Lloyd recorded in  Santa Barbara, California in May 2004 by Lloyd with Zakir Hussain, and Eric Harland.

Reception
The Allmusic review by Thom Jurek awarded the album 4 stars and states "This music, while rooted in the rhythms of the world, is jazz without a doubt... what's on offer here is something truly unexpected, something wildly original and essential to jazz-improvisatory communication". The All About Jazz review by Matt Cibula stated "this album captures the three grooviest motherfuckers in the world, all playing together perfectly, and it deserves some serious consideration as what ESPN would call "an instant classic"".

Track listing
All compositions by Charles Lloyd except as indicated
 "Dancing on One Foot" - 9:04  
 "Tales of Rumi" - 11:58  
 "Sangam" - 9:20  
 "Nataraj" - 2:47  
 "Guman" (Zakir Hussain) - 11:40  
 "Tender Warriors" - 8:56  
 "Hymn to the Mother" - 11:49  
 "Lady in the Harbor" - 3:27  
 "Little Peace" - 5:53

Personnel
Charles Lloyd - tenor saxophone, alto saxophone, bass flute, alto flute, tarogato, piano, percussion
Zakir Hussain - tabla, voice, percussion
Eric Harland - drums, percussion, piano

References

2006 live albums
Charles Lloyd (jazz musician) live albums
ECM Records live albums